Authorized Greatest Hits is a compilation album by the American rock band Cheap Trick. The tracks were picked by the band members themselves, in contrast to 1991's Greatest Hits. It contains several rarities, including one from the EP Found All the Parts.

Track listing

References

2000 greatest hits albums
Cheap Trick compilation albums
Epic Records compilation albums
Legacy Recordings compilation albums